Mathare United Football Club is a professional association football club, based in Nairobi, Kenya. They currently compete in the Kenyan Premier League, the top tier of the Kenyan football league system, and won their first league title during the 2008 season. The club plays its home games at the Moi International Sports Centre in Kasarani.

Current squad

Achievements
Kenyan Premier League: 1
 2008

Kenyan President's Cup: 2
 1998, 2000

Performance in CAF competitions
CAF Champions League: 1 appearance
2009 – Preliminary Round

CAF Cup: 1 appearance
2002 – First Round

CAF Cup Winners' Cup: 2 appearances
1999 – Second Round
2001 – First Round

Mathare Youth F.C.

Mathare Youth F.C. was a feeder team for Mathare United, until Mathare Youth were promoted to the Premier League to rival them. In August 2012, the team was disbanded. The club's league season is Sponsored by Triple5Bet, a sports betting company in Kenya.

Women's club
The club also has a women's football section called Mathare United Ladies' Football Club, which currently competes in the Kenyan Women's Premier League.

References

External links
 Mathare United Instagram - Official Instagram
 Mathare Youth Sports Association (M.Y.S.A.) – Official website
 Kenyan Footie – Kenyan Football Portal
 BBC World Service Programme "Assignment" on Mathare United

 
Kenyan Premier League clubs
Football clubs in Kenya
Association football clubs established in 1994
Sport in Nairobi